Slurm may refer to:

 Slurm Workload Manager, a free and open-source job scheduler for Linux and similar computers
 Slurm (Futurama), a fictional soft drink in the Futurama universe